Flynn is an Australian film about the early life of Errol Flynn, focusing on his time in New Guinea starring Guy Pearce in the title role.

Plot
A young Errol Flynn leaves Sydney and has various adventures in New Guinea. He returns to Australia and starts acting in movies.

Original Cast
Guy Pearce as Errol Flynn
Paul Cantoni Klaus Reicher
Rebecca Rigg as Penelope Watts
John Frawley as Headmaster
Jan Friedl as Deidre Watt
Sue Jones as Elsa Chauvel

Final Cast
Guy Pearce as Errol Flynn
Steven Berkoff as Klaus Reicher
Claudia Karvan as Penelope Watts
John Savage as Joe Stromberg
Wendy Matthews as Nightclub Singer
William Gluth as Professor Flynn
Nicki Paull as Marelle Flynn
Tim Hughes as James Dickson
Adam May as First Director

Production

Development
Frank Howson claimed he spent five years writing the script. "It was the hardest script I've ever written," he said. "He [Errol Flynn] was such an enigmatic figure."

Howson gave the lead role to Guy Pearce, with whom he had previously made two films. Pearce felt he did not look anything like Errol Flynn but his hair was cut and he wore brown contact lenses. "He was a very mixed up-person," Pearce said of Flynn. "Most of the things he did were out of desperation, trying to find himself. He was more like a kid who never grew up."

Original shoot
The movie was originally directed by Brian Kavanagh in 1989 on a budget of $3.5 million. Shooting took place in Melbourne, Cairns and New Guinea and was completed in September, despite the Cairns shoot being delayed by the 1989 Australian pilots' dispute.

Re-shoot
At the 1990 Cannes Film Festival, marketing group J and M became interested in distributing the film but thought it needed some re-shooting and some "name" stars. They provided a further $1 million for this to happen.

The film was then largely re-shot with Frank Howson stepping in as director, and some different support actors cast. Guy Pearce returned as Errol Flynn, but Rebecca Rigg, Jeff Truman and Paul Steven were replaced by Claudia Karvan, Steven Berkoff and John Savage. This caused trouble with Australia's Actors Equity because two Australian actors were replaced with foreign ones. New scenes were shot in Melbourne and Fiji, which stood in for New Guinea.

The Fijian unit was based out of Lase Lase, about 50 km from Nadi. No Fijian women would agree to go topless, so South African actress Sandi Schultz was imported to play the role of the chief's daughter. The Fijian men were reluctant to take their underwear off to play New Guinea natives. It was estimated about 40% of the film was reshot.

Release
The movie was screened at the 1993 Cannes Film Festival under the title My Forgotten Man, by which time Howson said he had been working on it for 30 months. He blamed the stress of making it on the breakup of his marriage and business partnership. Howson:
It was like a game of Russian roulette. You actually wondered whether you would finish the film before you went broke. I now know what Coppola must have felt like on Apocalypse Now because in the end you just keep throwing money at this thing.
The film was set for release by Village Roadshow but Frank Howson became embroiled in a copyright dispute with his business partner; Roadshow withdrew the film from release seven days before it was scheduled to open. The movie was subsequently released on video and DVD several years later and sold widely around the world.

In 2002 Pearce described the film as the worst he had made.

Awards

|-
| 1993
| My Forgotten Man
| AACTA Award BASF Award for Best Original Music Score  Anthony Marinelli, Billy Childs 
| 
|}

References

Tulich, Katherine, "The Making and Re-Making of Flynn", Cinema Papers, May 1991

External links

Australian biographical films
1996 films
Films scored by Anthony Marinelli
1990s English-language films